Turvo is a municipality in the state of Santa Catarina in the South region of Brazil. Its main economic activity is Agriculture. Known as the "capital of agricultural mechanization and rice."

List of mayors 
Since his emancipation from the municipality of Araranguá in 1949, Turvo has successively been directed by: 

 Osni Paulino da Silva - 1949
 Abele Bez Batti - 1949 to 1952
 Luiz Maragno - 1952 to 1954
 José Marcon - 1954 to 1959
 Antônio Dandolini - 1959 to 1964
 Sebastião M. de Mattos - 1964 to 1966
 Aldir Schmidt - 1966 to 1970
 Ires Olivo - 1970 to 1973
 Romeu Carlessi - 1973 to 1976
 Ari Pessi - 1976 to 1983
 Adoaldo Otávio Teixeira - 1983 to 1988
 Heriberto Afonso Schmidt - 1989 to 1992
 Ari Pessi - 1992 to 1996
 Heriberto Afonso Schmidt - 1997 to 2004
 José Brina Tramontim - 2005 to 2008
 Ronaldo Carlessi - 2009 to today

See also 

List of municipalities in Santa Catarina

References

Municipalities in Santa Catarina (state)